Alice Wood (20 October 1873 – 17 November 1949), known professionally as Alice Lloyd or Alice Hall, was a British music hall artist who was popular in America.

Life
Lloyd was born in Hoxton, London into the Wood family that included her elder celebrity sister Marie who adopted the name Marie Lloyd. There were ten children and many of them adopted the name Lloyd to appear in the music hall. Marie, Alice and Grace appeared as the "Sisters Lloyd".

Her sister Marie Lloyd was popular in Britain and it said that an American theatre owner, Percy G. Williams signed up Alice via his agents. He mistakenly thought he had contracted her elder sister Marie. Alice appeared in Vaudeville on Broadway in 1907 and it was claimed that her name was placed in lights of the theatre straight after her first performance. It was said that Marie was too coarse for American audiences and they preferred the more restrained Alice.

In 1908 she was on the ocean liner RMS Mauretania when a broken propeller damaged the ship. It was reported that Alice sang for an hour to calm the passengers whilst power was restored to the vessel.

In 1909 she was appearing in Seattle in her first tour of western America.

Lloyd died in the home in Banstead, Surrey in 1949.

References

1873 births
1949 deaths
People from Hoxton
20th-century British actresses
Music hall performers
Actresses from London
20th-century English women
20th-century English people